The 2018 Backlash was the 14th Backlash professional wrestling pay-per-view and livestreaming event produced by WWE. It was held for wrestlers from the promotion's Raw and SmackDown brand divisions. The event took place on May 6, 2018, at the Prudential Center in Newark, New Jersey. It was the first Backlash event since 2009 to feature multiple brands during a brand split. In 2019, Backlash was replaced by Stomping Grounds, but Backlash was reinstated in 2020.

The card comprised nine matches, including one on the Kickoff pre-show. In the main event, Roman Reigns defeated Samoa Joe. Also on the card, Seth Rollins retained Raw's Intercontinental Championship against The Miz in the opening bout, and SmackDown's WWE Champion AJ Styles and Shinsuke Nakamura fought to a draw. The show was also notable for Daniel Bryan's first singles pay-per-view match since Fastlane in February 2015.

Production

Background 
Backlash is a pay-per-view (PPV) and WWE Network event that was established by WWE in 1999. It was held annually from 1999 to 2009, but was then discontinued until it was reinstated in 2016. The original concept of the event was based around the backlash from WWE's flagship event, WrestleMania, but this theme was dropped with its revival in 2016. The 2018 event was the 14th Backlash and was scheduled to be held on May 6, 2018, at the Prudential Center in Newark, New Jersey. After the reintroduction of the brand extension in mid-2016, the events in 2016 and 2017 featured wrestlers exclusively from the SmackDown brand. The 2018 event was originally to be Raw-exclusive, but in February, WWE announced that following WrestleMania 34, brand-exclusive PPVs would be discontinued, thus the 2018 Backlash featured wrestlers from both Raw and SmackDown.

Storylines 
The show comprised nine matches, including one on the Kickoff pre-show, that resulted from scripted storylines, where wrestlers portrayed villains, heroes, or less distinguishable characters in scripted events that built tension and culminated in wrestling matches. Results were predetermined by WWE's writers on the Raw and SmackDown brands, while storylines were produced on WWE's weekly television shows, Monday Night Raw and SmackDown Live.

At WrestleMania 34, Brock Lesnar retained the Universal Championship against Roman Reigns and then was scheduled to defend the title against Reigns in a steel cage match at the Greatest Royal Rumble, which Reigns lost. On the following Raw, Reigns addressed his match against Lesnar when a returning Samoa Joe, who had been out with injury since January, interrupted him, called him a failure, and challenged him to a match at Backlash. During the Superstar Shake-up, Joe was traded to SmackDown.

At WrestleMania 34, AJ Styles retained the WWE Championship against Shinsuke Nakamura. After the match, Nakamura turned heel by attacking Styles with a low-blow. Repeated attacks by Nakamura led to a rematch at the Greatest Royal Rumble on April 27, which ended in a double countout. Subsequently, Styles was scheduled to defend his title against Nakamura at Backlash in a no disqualification match.

At WrestleMania 34, Seth Rollins defeated The Miz and Finn Bálor in a triple threat match to capture the Intercontinental Championship. The following night on Raw, The Miz invoked his championship rematch clause for Backlash. During the Superstar Shake-up, Miz was traded to SmackDown. Prior to Backlash, Rollins retained the title against Miz, Bálor, and Samoa Joe, who was also traded to SmackDown, at the Greatest Royal Rumble in a fatal four-way ladder match, making Rollins the defending champion at Backlash.

At WrestleMania 34, Jinder Mahal defeated Randy Orton, Bobby Roode, and Rusev in a fatal four-way match to win the United States Championship. On the following episode of SmackDown, Orton defeated Roode and Rusev in a triple threat match to face Mahal for the title at Backlash. However, on the April 16 edition of Raw, Mahal was traded to Raw during the Superstar Shake-up and lost the title to Jeff Hardy, and Mahal invoked his rematch clause at the Greatest Royal Rumble. Hardy was then traded to SmackDown the next night, where as Orton was about to face Shelton Benjamin, Hardy interrupted his entrance and took the match instead. The following week, Hardy was set to face Benjamin, but Orton this time interrupted Hardy and took the match. Hardy retained his championship at the Greatest Royal Rumble against Mahal, making Hardy the defending champion against Orton at Backlash. On the May 1 episode of SmackDown, Orton and Hardy teamed up and defeated Miz and Benjamin, after which, Orton attacked Hardy with an RKO.

At WrestleMania 34, Nia Jax defeated Alexa Bliss to win the Raw Women's Championship. A rematch for the championship was later scheduled for Backlash.

On the April 10 episode of SmackDown, Charlotte Flair, who had just retained the SmackDown Women's Championship against Asuka at WrestleMania 34, was attacked by The IIconics (Billie Kay and Peyton Royce). Carmella took advantage of the opportunity and cashed in her Money in the Bank contract and won the championship. A rematch was later scheduled for Backlash.

On the April 17 episode of SmackDown, Big Cass returned from injury, aiding Shinsuke Nakamura in attacking AJ Styles and Daniel Bryan during a match in which the two were teaming together. The following week, a Miz TV segment with Daniel Bryan was advertised, but instead Cass came out. (It was later revealed that Cass had attacked him backstage.) SmackDown General Manager Paige scheduled a match between the two for Backlash. At Greatest Royal Rumble, Cass eliminated Bryan from the Greatest Royal Rumble match.

On the April 9 episode of Raw, Bobby Lashley returned to WWE after a ten-year absence. Also that night, Kevin Owens and Sami Zayn appeared backstage on Raw and tried to convince Raw General Manager Kurt Angle to hire them since they were unsuccessful in gaining back their jobs on SmackDown at WrestleMania 34. Angle decided that the winner of a match between the two would get a contract, but the match ended in a double countout, so neither received a contract. On the April 16 episode, however, Raw Commissioner Stephanie McMahon awarded both Owens and Zayn contracts. The two were later involved in a 10-man tag team match, and were defeated by the opposing team, which included Lashley and Braun Strowman. On the April 30 episode, Roman Reigns, Lashley, and Strowman defeated Jinder Mahal, Owens, and Zayn in a six-man tag team match. During the match, Strowman continuously sent Owens and Zayn crashing into the barricade walls. Later in the night, a match between Lashley and Strowman against Owens and Zayn was made for Backlash.

Event

Pre-show 
During the Backlash Kickoff pre-show, Bayley took on Ruby Riott. After a distraction by The Riott Squad (Liv Morgan and Sarah Logan), Riott performed the Riott Kick on Bayley for the win.

Preliminary matches
The actual pay-per-view opened with Seth Rollins defending the Intercontinental Championship against The Miz. During the match, Miz targeted Rollins' leg, applying the figure-four leglock multiple times. Twice, Miz achieved near-falls after hitting Rollins with Skull-Crushing Finale but in the end was pinned by Rollins following a Curb Stomp.

Next, Nia Jax defended the Raw Women's Championship against Alexa Bliss. In the end, Jax performed a Samoan drop on Bliss to retain the title. After the match, Jax cut a promo about bullying and stated that everyone is a star and one should not worry about their appearance.

After that, Jeff Hardy defended the United States Championship against Randy Orton. After Orton missed an RKO, Hardy delivered a Twist of Fate followed by a Swanton Bomb to retain the championship.

Next, Elias tried to perform a song but was repeatedly interrupted by The New Day (Big E, Kofi Kingston and Xavier Woods), Rusev, Aiden English and No Way Jose's Conga line (which included Titus O'Neil, Apollo Crews, Dana Brooke, Tyler Breeze and Fandango). Bobby Roode attacked Elias with a Glorious DDT.

In the fourth match, Daniel Bryan faced Big Cass. In the end, Bryan forced Cass to submit to the Yes Lock to win the match. After the match, Cass attacked Bryan with a big boot.

After that, Carmella defended the SmackDown Women's Championship against Charlotte Flair. Charlotte performed a spear on Carmella, who countered a Figure Four Leglock attempt into the Code of Silence. Charlotte got to her feet to escape the hold, but Carmella rolled her up for a nearfall. Charlotte then performed a Big Boot for a nearfall. In the end, Charlotte attempted a moonsault, but missed and buckled her left knee. Carmella then kicked Charlotte's knee and pinned her to retain the title.

In the next match, AJ Styles defended the WWE Championship against Shinsuke Nakamura in a No Disqualification match. As Nakamura went for the Kinshasa, Styles attacked Nakamura's knee with a chair. Nakamura delivered a low blow on Styles, only for Styles to attack Nakamura with a low blow. Nakamura and Styles attacked each other with a low blow simultaneously; both could not answer the referee's count of ten, thus the match ended as a draw, which resulted in Styles retaining the championship.

In the penultimate match, Bobby Lashley and Braun Strowman took on Kevin Owens and Sami Zayn. In the end, Lashley delivered a stalling suplex to Owens for the win. After the match, Strowman performed a running powerslam on both Owens and Zayn.

Main event
In the main event, Roman Reigns fought Samoa Joe. Before the match began, Joe attacked Reigns and put him through a broadcast table with a uranage. Reigns performed a superman punch on Joe for a near-fall. Reigns performed a Spear on Joe, who placed his foot on the bottom rope to void the pin. Joe applied the Coquina Clutch on Reigns, who got to the rope to escape. In the end, Reigns pinned Joe after another Spear to win the match.

Reception 
The event received largely negative reviews. Dave Meltzer, for the Wrestling Observer Newsletter, wrote that "aside from Rollins vs. Miz, this has been a really bad show."  The show was so poor that "one of [WWE's] hottest crowds of the year" "didn't even react to Strowman's big move" near the end of the event. For the Joe-Reigns main event, Meltzer wrote that it was definitely not a good match, it "started off boring and the crowd hated it, chanting boring, chanting for [CM] Punk, lots of people were leaving". The tag team match was "a mess", and the finish of the Nakamura-Styles world title match was so bad that it turned a "very good" match into a "disappointing" match overall. For the women's matches, Meltzer described Bayley-Riott as sloppy but noted that the crowd were behind Bayley, this was in contrast to the crowd being less interested for Bliss-Jax, which was followed by a "contrived" anti-bullying segment by Jax and Michael Cole. Meanwhile, Charlotte-Carmella was "hard to watch because it had to be athletically dumbed down" for Carmella.

Brian Campbell and Adam Silverstein of CBS Sports wrote that many results on the show left fans "annoyed" and dissatisfied, especially since Joe-Reigns and Nakamura-Styles "disappointed from a storytelling perspective." They described that it was "impossible to ignore how poorly WWE continues to treat its own fanbase" as WWE went "back to the well in booking the despised Reigns as a heroic babyface able to overcome all odds", resulting in a D+ graded "main event that was largely ignored by the Newark crowd, producing chants of 'CM Punk', 'Rusev Day' and 'beat the traffic' as fans exited the arena before the finish." The writers felt that Styles and Nakamura "certainly deserved better" as it for "the second straight week, WWE presented a PPV in which the WWE championship wasn't contested in the main event. Even worse, both times it ended without a clean finish", so "the ending fell flat in what had been a strong match" for a B+ graded world title match. As for the theme of low blows in the Styles-Nakamura feud, it "came across as either comedic or disrespectful for the skills and standing of both." Additionally, the "brief and rather pedestrian match" between Daniel Bryan and Big Cass was rated C+, but Big Cass' post-match attack made it "hard to disregard just how angry he makes the crowd as a pure heel."

Bob Kapur for Canoe.com's SLAM! Wrestling wrote that "the only Backlash should be the criticism that the company gets" for this "pretty lousy show", "full of dull matches with finishes that ranged from uninspired to dumb to just plain terrible". The "terrible finish" was referencing that of the Styles-Nakamura match which "felt like a big kick to the nads of everyone watching". The main event was "pretty boring", as was the "Randy Orton bore-a-thon" United States title match. The only positives were the "fantastic" Intercontinental title match which had "cool sequences" and Elias' segment which was "very entertaining".

Aaron Oster of The Baltimore Sun described Backlash as "lackluster", saying all but two matches (Miz-Rollins and Nakamura-Styles) were bad and "nothing of importance really happened in the show — no title changes, no meaningful story moments ... the show couldn't have been much less important". But even for Nakamura-Styles, Oster wrote that repeating the draw finish from the Greatest Royal Rumble nine days prior was letting "the storyline to advance another week without anything happening".

USA Today described WWE fans as being "stunned" and "fuming" at WWE's decision to let Roman Reigns' match be the Backlash main event over the WWE Championship match. Aaron Oster of The Baltimore Sun also agreed on this point. One fan interpreted that the arrangement showed that Reigns is more important than the world title, while another ridiculed how Reigns "has spent months complaining that someone else is the company favourite and there's a conspiracy against him" but yet "is closing a PPV in a non-title match with nothing on the line."

Aftermath
A Backlash event was originally scheduled to be held in June 2019, but the event was canceled and replaced by Stomping Grounds. In 2020, however, Backlash was reinstated.

Raw
After Backlash, focus shifted on the next PPV event, Money in the Bank. On the following Raw, Kurt Angle scheduled multiple Money in the Bank qualifying matches for that subsequent episode, only to be interrupted by Kevin Owens and Braun Strowman, who both wanted to partake in the men's ladder match. Angle scheduled a match between Strowman and Owens, which Strowman won. Later that night, Finn Bálor defeated Roman Reigns and Sami Zayn to qualify for that ladder match after interference from Jinder Mahal. The following week, more Money in the Bank qualifying matches took place. Reigns attacked Mahal, removing him from the second triple threat qualifying match for the men. Owens took Mahal's place and defeated Bobby Lashley and Elias, also in a triple threat match, to qualify for the match.

Also on the following Raw, Intercontinental Champion Seth Rollins addressed the fans about his reign and issued an open challenge for the title, which was accepted by Mojo Rawley, who Rollins defeated to retain the title. Rollins then retained against Owens the following week and against Mahal on the May 28 episode before being attacked by Elias, setting up a match between Elias and Rollins for the title at Money in the Bank.

Bobby Lashley was interviewed about his family, including his three sisters. The following week, Sami Zayn said that Lashley was not a nice guy and promised to bring out Lashley's sisters to tell the truth. On the May 21 episode of Raw, three men dressed up as Lashley's sisters accused Lashley of violence. Lashley interrupted the segment and attacked the impostors along with Zayn. The following week, a match between Lashley and Zayn was scheduled for Money in the Bank.

After being attacked by Bobby Roode during his concert at Backlash, Elias took on Roode on the following Raw in a losing effort. The following week, Roode defeated Baron Corbin and No Way Jose, also in a triple threat match, to qualify for the men's Money in the Bank ladder match.

For the women's Money in the Bank ladder match, Ember Moon and Alexa Bliss won their respective triple threat matches to qualify for the match.

SmackDown
Money in the Bank qualifying matches continued on the following SmackDown. The Miz and Rusev won their respective matches to qualify for the men's match, and Charlotte Flair won her match to qualify for the women's.

Due to the controversial finish to their match at Backlash, another match between AJ Styles and Shinsuke Nakamura for the WWE Championship was scheduled for Money in the Bank. On the May 15 episode of SmackDown, Nakamura defeated Styles in a non-title match to pick the stipulation for the match, and chose a Last Man Standing match the following week.

Daniel Bryan and Big Cass also continued their rivalry. Bryan attacked Cass on the May 15 episode of SmackDown and at a house show in Germany, where he injured Cass' leg. As a result, Bryan cost Cass a spot in a Money in the Bank qualifying match, and subsequently won his match to qualify for the men's ladder match. On the May 29 episode, Cass returned and he and Bryan lost a triple threat Money in the Bank qualifying match to Samoa Joe. Afterwards, Cass attacked Bryan, setting up another match between the two for Money in the Bank.

Results

References

External links 

2018
2018 WWE Network events
2018 WWE pay-per-view events
Professional wrestling in Newark, New Jersey
Events in Newark, New Jersey
2018 in New Jersey
May 2018 events in the United States